General Sir Felix Fordati Ready,  (16 July 1872 – 6 April 1940) was a British Army officer who served as Quartermaster-General to the Forces from 1931 to 1935. He was considered an expert in military tactics.

Military career
Ready was the son of Colonel John Tobin Ready and the grandson of John Ready, former Lieutenant Governor of the Isle of Man. Educated at Wellington College, Ready was commissioned into the Royal Berkshire Regiment as a second lieutenant on 5 December 1891. He was promoted to lieutenant on 28 July 1894, and was part of the Kitchener Expedition to defeat the Mahdi in Sudan 1898–99, taking part in the battles of Atbara (April 1898) and Omdurman (September 1898).

With the 2nd battalion of his regiment, he served in South Africa during the Second Boer War 1899–1900, taking part in operations in the Orange Free State from February to July 1900 and Transvaal from July to November 1900. He returned to South Africa in 1902, as the war drew to a close, and was promoted to captain on 15 January 1902. For his service in the war he was mentioned in despatches, received the Distinguished Service Order (DSO) and the Queen's South Africa Medal with three clasps. After the end of the war in June 1902, Ready and the rest of the 2nd battalion was sent to Egypt, where they arrived on the SS Dominion in November 1902.

He served in World War I as Adjutant-General in Mesopotamia. He was appointed General Officer Commanding Northern Ireland District in 1926 before becoming General Officer Commanding 1st Division at Aldershot in 1929 and then Quartermaster-General to the Forces in 1931. He was made a general in 1934 and retired in 1935.

Personal life
In 1900, he married Marguerite Violet Daisy Cotterill. He died at his home in Kensington, London, on 6 April 1940, aged 67.

References

|-

|-
 

1872 births
1940 deaths
Knights Grand Cross of the Order of the British Empire
Knights Commander of the Order of the Bath
Companions of the Order of the Star of India
Companions of the Order of St Michael and St George
Companions of the Distinguished Service Order
Royal Berkshire Regiment officers
British Army generals
People educated at Wellington College, Berkshire
People educated at Stubbington House School
British Army personnel of the Mahdist War
British Army personnel of the Second Boer War
British Army personnel of World War I
Manx people